The 2009 Kerry Senior Football Championship was the 109th staging of the Kerry Senior Football Championship since its establishment by the Kerry County Board in 1889. The draw for the opening round took place on 16 May 2009. The championship ran from 19 June to 1 November 2009.

Mid Kerry entered the championship as the defending champions, however, they were beaten by Feale Rangers in the quarter-finals.

The final was played on 1 November 2009 at FitzGerald Stadium in Killarney, between South Kerry and Dr. Crokes in what was their third meeting in the final overall and a first in three years. South Kerry won the match by 1-08 to 0-10 to claim their ninth championship title overall and a first title in three years.

South Kerry's Bryan Sheehan was the championship's top scorer with  1-33.

Team changes

To Championship

Promoted from the Kerry Intermediate Football Championship
 St Michael's/Foilmore

From Championship

Relegated to the Kerry Intermediate Football Championship
 John Mitchels

Results

Round 1

Round 2

Round 3

 Mid Kerry received a bye in this round.

Relegation playoff

Quarter-finals

Semi-finals

Final

Championship statistics

Top scorers

Overall

In a single game

Miscellaneous

 St Michael's/Foilmore make their first appearance at senior level.
 Kerins O'Rahilly's play in the Munster Senior Club Football Championship having won the Kerry Club Football Championship.

References

Kerry Senior Football Championship
2009 in Gaelic football